Sidney William Souers (March 30, 1892 – January 14, 1973) was an American admiral and intelligence expert.

Rear Admiral Souers was appointed as the first Director of Central Intelligence on January 23, 1946, by President Harry S. Truman, where he would be in charge of the new Central Intelligence Group (CIG).  Prior to this, as Deputy Director of Naval Intelligence, Souers had been one of the architects of the system that came into being with the President's directive. He had written the intelligence chapter of the Eberstadt Report, which advocated a unified intelligence system. Toward the end of 1945, when the competing plans for a national intelligence system were deadlocked, Souers' views had come to the attention of the President, and he seems to have played a role in breaking the impasse.

Souers subsequently became executive secretary of the United States National Security Council. In this role he saw President Truman daily, and was the person Truman talked to most regarding national security issues. It was through Souers that Truman first learned of the possible existence of the hydrogen bomb, and Souers coordinated some of the work being done by different departments during the U.S. government's debate regarding whether to go forward with the development of that weapon.

Timeline
 1911–1912 Student at Purdue University
 1914 A.B., Miami University, member of the Kappa chapter of Delta Kappa Epsilon
 1920–1925 President, Mortgage & Securities Company, New Orleans
 1922–1928 President and founder, First Joint Stock Land Bank
 1925–1926 Executive, Piggly Wiggly Stores, Memphis
 1925–1930 Executive vice president, Canal Bank & Trust Company, New Orleans
 1927–1930 Member, New Orleans Port Authority
 1929 (April 29) Appointed lieutenant commander, U.S. Naval Reserve
 1929–1934 Member, board of directors, Aviation Corporation
 1930–1933 Vice president, Missouri State Life Insurance Company, St. Louis
 1932–1940 U.S. Naval Reserve, intelligence officer, inactive status
 1933–1973 Executive, General American Life Insurance Company
 1940 (July 22) Called to active duty
 1944 (July 24) Became assistant director of the Office of Naval Intelligence, Office of the Chief of Naval Operations, Navy Department
 1945 (November 8) Designated deputy chief of Naval Intelligence, with the rank of rear admiral
 1946 (January 23) Appointed Director of Central Intelligence, Central Intelligence Group
 1946 (July 22) Relieved of active duty
 1947–1950 Executive secretary, National Security Council
 1950–1953 Special consultant to the President on military and foreign affairs

References

External links 
Biography at Truman Presidential Library 
Biography at the Central Intelligence Agency

1892 births
1973 deaths
Directors of the Central Intelligence Agency
Miami University alumni
Military personnel from Dayton, Ohio
United States Navy admirals